The Venezuelan Basketball Federation (abbreviated as FVB), is a governing body for basketball in Venezuela. It directs and oversees all of the basketball national teams of Venezuela, including both the junior and senior national teams of both men and women.

History
The Venezuelan Basketball Federation was founded in 1935, and joined FIBA in 1938.

Notable people
 

José Herrera Uslar (born 1906), lawyer

References

External links
Official website 

Basketball governing bodies in South America
Federation
Venezuela
Basketball
Sports organizations established in 1935